The Naunspitze is a  peak in the Zahmer Kaiser, the northern ridge of the Kaiser Mountains in Tyrol, Austria. Seen from the west it is the first independent summit on the main crest. To the south it falls sharply away and, to the north, ends abruptly in a steep rock face that towers over the Inn valley near Ebbs. The next peak along the main ridge to the east is the Petersköpfl (1745m), which is separated from the Naunspitze by a small wind gap.

Ascents 
The Naunspitze may be reached without difficulty in about 45 minutes from the Vorderkaiserfelden Hut to the southwest, or in 20 minutes from the Petersköpfl. Several Alpine climbing routes lead up the rock faces to the north and west classified by the UIAA as grade III.

References 

Mountains of the Alps
Mountains of Tyrol (state)
One-thousanders of Austria
Kaiser Mountains